Callender is a census-designated place in San Luis Obispo County, California, United States. Callender is located along California State Route 1 south of Arroyo Grande. The population was 1,262 at the 2010 census.

Geography
According to the United States Census Bureau, the CDP covers an area of 2.3 square miles (5.9 km2), all of it land.

Demographics

The 2010 United States Census reported that Callender had a population of 1,262. The racial makeup of Callender was 1,003 (79.5%) White, 7 (0.6%) African American, 22 (1.7%) Native American, 48 (3.8%) Asian, 0 (0.0%) Pacific Islander, 128 (10.1%) from other races, and 54 (4.3%) from two or more races. Hispanic or Latino of any race were 355 persons (28.1%).

The Census reported that 1,262 people (100% of the population) lived in households, 0 (0%) lived in non-institutionalized group quarters, and 0 (0%) were institutionalized.

There were 439 households, out of which 144 (32.8%) had children under the age of 18 living in them, 263 (59.9%) were opposite-sex married couples living together, 39 (8.9%) had a female householder with no husband present, 27 (6.2%) had a male householder with no wife present.  There were 33 (7.5%) unmarried opposite-sex partnerships, and 3 (0.7%) same-sex married couples or partnerships. 75 households (17.1%) were made up of individuals, and 22 (5.0%) had someone living alone who was 65 years of age or older. The average household size was 2.87.  There were 329 families (74.9% of all households); the average family size was 3.21.

The population was spread out, with 291 people (23.1%) under the age of 18, 110 people (8.7%) aged 18 to 24, 284 people (22.5%) aged 25 to 44, 415 people (32.9%) aged 45 to 64, and 162 people (12.8%) who were 65 years of age or older.  The median age was 41.8 years. For every 100 females, there were 106.5 males.  For every 100 females age 18 and over, there were 107.9 males.

The homeowner vacancy rate was 2.3%; the rental vacancy rate was 1.3%.  827 people (65.5% of the population) lived in owner-occupied housing units and 435 people (34.5%) lived in rental housing units.

References

Census-designated places in San Luis Obispo County, California
Census-designated places in California